Gudivada Municipality is the local self government in Gudivada of the Indian state of Andhra Pradesh.

History

The municipality was constituted in the year 1927.

Governance
The municipality consists of a chairperson and its wards committee. YSR Congress Party won the Gudivada municipal elections in 2014. TBA is the present chairman of the municipality and the vice-chairman is TBA. The present municipal commissioner is P.J. Sampath Kumar.

Civic infrastructure and services
The city residents rely on hand pumps and motors for water. The municipality provides 87 litres of water per head every day. The other works such as, sewage, internal drainage system and road margins are also taken by the authorities.

Sri Kodali Venkateswara Rao (Nani) Park (or Rajendra Nagar Park) was constructed by the Public Works Department in 2005 and is maintained by the municipality.

Awards and achievements
The city is one among the 31 cities in the state to be a part of water supply and sewerage services mission known as Atal Mission for Rejuvenation and Urban Transformation (AMRUT). In 2015, as per the Swachh Bharat Abhiyan of the Ministry of Urban Development, Gudivada Municipality was ranked 450th in the country.

References

External links

1937 establishments in India
Government agencies established in 1937
Urban local bodies in Andhra Pradesh